Voices of Classic Rock is a rock music ensemble featuring singers and musicians from classic rock groups popular in the 1970s and 1980s.

Voices of Classic Rock was formed in 1998.
In 2001, following the September 11 attacks, they released a version of "The Battle Hymn of the Republic".

Membership 
Singers and musicians who have performed as part of Voices of Classic Rock include:
 Mike Reno, singer with Loverboy
 Bobby Kimball, singer with Toto
 John Cafferty, singer with John Cafferty & The Beaver Brown Band
 Joe Lynn Turner, singer with Rainbow and Deep Purple
 Benjamin Orr, singer and bassist of The Cars
 Pat Travers, singer and multi-instrumentalist
 Glenn Hughes, bassist and singer with Deep Purple and Black Sabbath
 Spencer Davis, multi-instrumentalist
 Gary U.S. Bonds, singer and songwriter
 Mickey Thomas, singer with Jefferson Starship
 Jimi Jamison, singer with Survivor
 Nick Gilder, singer
 Barry Dunaway, bassist with Pat Travers, Yngwie Malmsteen
 Alex Ligertwood Singer Santana
 Larry Hoppen, guitarist and vocalist for Orleans
 Fergie Frederiksen, singer for Toto
 Peter Rivera, singer and drummer with Rare Earth
 Ronnie Hammond, singer with Atlanta Rhythm Section

References 

American rock music groups
Musical groups established in 1998